Avet is an Armenian male given name. Notable people with this name include:

 Avet Avetisyan (1897-1971), Armenian actor
 Avet Barseghyan, Armenian songwriter and TV host
 Avet Ter-Gabrielyan (1899–1983), Armenian violinist and the founder of the Komitas Quartet
 Avet Terterian (1929-1994), Armenian composer

See also
 Flaminio Avet, French-born Italian World War I flying ace